Reg Alaqadari is a village and the center of Reg District in Kandahar Province of Afghanistan. It is connected by highway with Shorabak District to the east and Garmsir District in neighboring Helmand Province to the west. Security in and around the village is provided by the Afghan National Police, which includes the Afghan Border Police.

The population of the area is predominantly Pashto-speaking ethnic Baloch people.

See also
Transport in Afghanistan

References

External links

Populated places in Kandahar Province